The non-marine mollusks of Montana — a part of the molluscan fauna of the state in the Northwestern United States. The non-marine mollusks of Montana consist of land snails and slugs as well as freshwater snails, freshwater mussels and freshwater clams.

Species
A number of species of non-marine molluscs are found in the wild in Montana.

Gastropods
There at least 155 species of gastropods found in Montana. Some of these species are exotics (not native to Montana) and some species have been designated as Species of Concern.

Freshwater bivalves
There are at least 42 species of freshwater bivalves known in Montana. The Montana Department of Fish, Wildlife and Parks has identified a number of bivalve species as Species of Concern.

List of non-marine molluscs

Freshwater gastropods
Freshwater gastropods in Montana include:

Bithyniidae
 Bithynia tentaculata

Thiaridae
 Melanoides tuberculata

Valvatidae
 Valvata lewisi
 Valvata humeralis
 Valvata sincera
 Valvata tricarinata

Hydrobiidae
 Pyrgulopsis bedfordensis
 Fluminicola fuscus
 Probythinella emarginata
 Potamopyrgus antipodarum
 Colligyrus greggi
 Amnicola limosa
 an undescribed species of Amnicola, currently known as "Lake Amnicola" or "Amnicola sp. 1"

Acroloxidae
 Acroloxus coloradensis

Lymnaeidae
 Stagnicola apicina
 Radix auricularia
 Fossaria dalli
 Stagnicola elrodi
 Fossaria obrussa
 Stagnicola elrodiana
 Fossaria humilis
 Stagnicola elodes
 Pseudosuccinea columella
 Stagnicola montanensis
 Fossaria bulimoides
 Fossaria parva
 Fossaria modicella
 Fisherola nuttalli
 Lymnaea stagnalis
 Stagnicola traski
 Stagnicola catascopium
 Stagnicola caperata

Physidae
 Physella vinosa
 Physa skinneri
 Aplexa elongata
 Physa megalochlamys
 Physa jennessi
 Physella acuta
 Physella virgata
 Physella propinqua
 Physella columbiana
 Physella gyrina
 Physella lordi
 Physella zionis

Planorbidae
 Gyraulus parvus
 Menetus opercularis
 Gyraulus circumstriatus
 Planorbella pilsbryi
 Gyraulus deflectus
 Planorbella trivolvis
 Planorbula campestris
 Promenetus exacuous megas
 Planorbella subcrenata
 Promenetus exacuous
 Gyraulus crista
 Planorbula armigera
 Helisoma anceps
 Promenetus umbilicatellus
 Ferrissia rivularis
 Ferrissia fragilis
 Ferrissia parallelus

Land gastropods
Land gastropods in Montana include:

Succineidae
 Catinella rehderi
 Catinella vermeta
 Oxyloma decampi
 Oxyloma gouldi
 Oxyloma haydeni
 Oxyloma missoula
 Oxyloma nuttallianum
 Oxyloma retusum
 Succinea grosvenori

Arionidae
 Arion ater
 Arion circumscriptus
 Arion distinctus
 Arion fasciatus
 Arion intermedius
 Arion rufus
 Arion subfuscus
 Hemphillia camelus
 Hemphillia danielsi
 Kootenaia burkei
 Magnipelta mycophaga
 Prophysaon andersoni
 Prophysaon humile
 Udosarx lyrata - with subspecies: Udosarx lyrata lyrata and Udosarx lyrata russelli
 Zacoleus idahoensis

Megomphicidae
 Polygyrella polygyrella

Vertiginidae
 Columella columella
 Columella edentula
 Gastrocopta armifera
 Gastrocopta holzingeri
 Gastrocopta pentodon
 Vertigo binneyana
 Vertigo concinnula
 Vertigo cristata
 Vertigo elatior
 Vertigo gouldi
 Vertigo modesta
 Vertigo ovata

Pupillidae
 Pupilla blandi
 Pupilla hebes
 Pupilla muscorum
 Pupilla syngenes

Discidae
 Anguispira kochi
 Discus whitneyi
 Discus brunsoni
 Discus shimekii

Limacidae
 Limax maximus

Agriolimacidae
 Deroceras laeve
 Deroceras panormitanum
 Deroceras reticulatum

Oxychilidae
 Nesovitrea electrina
 Nesovitrea binneyana
 Oxychilus draparnaudi
 Oxychilus alliarius

Gastrodontidae
 Striatura pugetensis
 Zonitoides arboreus
 Zonitoides nitidus

Pristilomatidae
 Hawaiia minuscula
 Pristiloma arcticum
 Pristiloma chersinella
 Pristiloma wascoense

Vitrinidae
 Vitrina pellucida

Euconulidae
 Euconulus fulvus

Haplotrematidae
 Haplotrema vancouverense

Oreohelicidae
 Oreohelix alpina
 Oreohelix amariradix
 Oreohelix carinifera
 Oreohelix elrodi
 Oreohelix haydeni
 Oreohelix pygmaea
 Oreohelix strigosa - with subspecies: Oreohelix strigosa berryi and Oreohelix strigosa depressa
 Oreohelix subrudis
 Oreohelix yavapai - with subspecies: Oreohelix yavapai mariae'

Polygyridae
 Allogona ptychophora Cryptomastix mullani Cryptomastix sanburniCochlicopidae
 Cochlicopa lubricaCharopidae
 Radiodiscus abietumPunctidae
 Paralaoma caputspinulae Punctum randolphi Punctum californicum Punctum minutissimumThysanophoridae
 Microphysula ingersolliValloniidae
 Vallonia albula Vallonia costata Vallonia cyclophorella Vallonia gracilicosta Vallonia perspectiva Vallonia pulchella Zoogenetes harpa Freshwater bivalves 
Freshwater bivalves in Montana include:

Margaritiferidae
 Margaritifera falcataUnionidae
 Lampsilis siliquoidea Lasmigona complanata Ligumia recta Pyganodon grandis Quadrula quadrulaSphaeriidae
 Musculium lacustre Musculium partumeium Musculium securis Musculium transversum Pisidium adamsi Pisidium arbortivum Pisidium casertanum Pisidium compressum Pisidium conventus Pisidium fallax Pisidium ferrugineum Pisidium idahoense Pisidium imbecille Pisidium insigne Pisidium lilljeborgii Pisidium milium Pisidium nitidum Pisidium obtusale Pisidium ovum Pisidium roperi Pisidium rotundatum Pisidium scutulatum Pisidium subtruncatum Pisidium variabile - with subspecies: Pisidium variabile magnum Pisidium ventricosum Pisidium walkeri Sphaerium fabale Sphaerium nitidum Sphaerium occidentale Sphaerium patella Sphaerium rhomboideum Sphaerium simile Sphaerium striatinum Sphaerium sulcatum Sphaerium tenue''

See also
 List of non-marine molluscs of the United States
 List of flora and fauna of Montana

References

Further reading
 
 
 
 

.Montana
Molluscs
Montana
.Montana
.Montana
Montana